Delyana Dacheva (born February 25, 1982) is a Bulgarian sprint canoer who competed in the early to mid-2000s. She won two medals at the ICF Canoe Sprint World Championships with a silver (K-2 500 m: 2003) and a bronze (K-2 200 m: 2002).

Dacheva also finished sixth in the K-2 500 m event at the 2004 Summer Olympics in Athens.

In the period 2008 - 2009 Dacheva was invited to become a coach of the USA women's kayak national team. She took the team to 2009 ICF Canoe Sprint World Championships competition.

Currently Delyana lives with her family in USA.She has hyphenated her name: Dacheva-Andonov after her husband.

References

Sports-reference.com profile

1982 births
Bulgarian female canoeists
Canoeists at the 2004 Summer Olympics
Living people
Olympic canoeists of Bulgaria
ICF Canoe Sprint World Championships medalists in kayak